Man from Wareika was the first album recording for Rico Rodriguez led by his own artistic imagination, and his first recording created for album release. It is notable for being the only roots reggae album to be released on Blue Note Records.

After recording one track ("Africa") in London with engineer Dick Cuthell as a kind of a demo for label owner Chris Blackwell - its arrangement is completely different in comparison to the rest of the album and contains flute and chorus - Rodriguez was offered a contract to record this album; and he could arrange to record in Jamaica.

After 15 years Rodriguez returned for the first time to Jamaica. He had left the country in 1961 when he was already heavily involved in creating the then new ska sound. In 1976 he added something new to reggae music. A critic wrote in 1977 that the album "does not just reflect the current popular trends, but ... expresses in a definitive way the Jamaican music tradition."

The nine self-composed tracks on the album offer Jamaican rhythms with horn lines between a melodic use (e.g. on "This Day" and "Lumumba") and jazz; the latter helped to define something like a new genre, Jamaican jazz, transforming the experience from early ska days into 1970s roots reggae. Most of the songs remain in Rodriguez's live repertoire until today. Some have been re-recorded by other artists as well as by himself.

Track listing
All compositions and arrangements by Rico Rodriguez

"This Day" – 4:14
"Ramble" – 4:11
"Lumumba" – 4:01
"Africa" – 4:36
"Man from Wareika" – 3:16
"Rasta" – 3:38
"Over the Mountain" – 3:14
"Gunga Din" – 3:53
"Dial Africa" – 3:22

Personnel
Rico Rodriguez - trombone
Viv "Talent" Hall - trumpet
Bobby Ellis - trumpet
Richard "Dirty Harry" Hall - tenor saxophone
George Lee - tenor saxophone
Herman Marquis - alto saxophone
Ray Allen - alto saxophone
Bernard "Touter" Harvey - keyboards
Ansell Collins - keyboards
Errol "Tarzan" Nelson - keyboards
Karl Pitterson - lead guitar, keyboards, percussion
Radcliffe "Duggie" Bryan - lead guitar
Junior Hanson Marvin - lead guitar
Lloyd Parks - rhythm guitar
Ras Robbie Shakespeare - bass
Sly Dunbar - drums
Skully - wood drums
Flick - fussy tambourine

Personnel on "Africa"
Rico Rodriguez - trombone
Eddie "Tan Tan" Thornton - trumpet
Keith Gemmell - tenor saxophone
Tony Washington - keyboards
Phillip Chen - rhythm guitar
Bunny McKenzie - bass
Jacko - drums
Tony Utah - percussion
Satch Dixon - percussion
Ijahman - backing vocals
Candy McKenzie - backing vocals

Recorded at Joe Gibbs Studios and Randy's Recording Studio, Kingston, Jamaica, September 1976.
Engineers: Karl Pitterson, Errol Thompson, Dick Cuthell, assisted by Flick.
"Africa" was recorded at Island Hammersmith Studios, May 1976 by Dick Cuthell.
All tracks mixed at Island Basing Street Studios by Karl Pitterson and Dick Cuthell, assisted by Kevin Dallimore.
Executive producer: Chris Blackwell

Cover illustration by Tony Wright.
Design by Eckford/Stimpson.

Releases
1977:
LP: Island ILPS 9485 /UK
LP: Blue Note BN LA819 H /US
LP: Top Ranking no # /Jamaica
ca. late 1980s:
CD: Mango /Island CID 9485 /UK
1999/2000:
Vinyl Only /Island
2004:
CD: Island Japan
2016:
CD: Caroline International CAROLR049CD (Double CD featuring 'Man From Wareika' and 'Wareika Dub' with extra tracks.)
Man From Wareika was also remixed into a dub version, released as Warrika Dub (LP: Ghetto Rockers PRE 1), re-released 2004 in Japan on Island CD.

External links
 Two-Tone Records
 Roots Archives

1977 albums
Rico Rodriguez (musician) albums
Island Records albums
Blue Note Records albums